Double-wide or Double Wide may refer to:

 Double-wide, a style of mobile home
 Double Wide (album), debut studio album by American recording artist Uncle Kracker
 Double Wide, a fictional character on the Adult Swim television series Stroker & Hoop
 Double Wide, a contemporary western crime novel written by Leo W. Banks and published by Brash Books

See also

  or 
  or 

 Best of Jeff Foxworthy: Double Wide, Single Minded, a 2004 comedy album by Jeff Foxworthy
 Southside Double-Wide: Acoustic Live, a 2004 album by Sevendust
 "Double Wide Dream", a single on the 2011 album Double-Wide Dream by Casey Donahew
 "Double Wide Paradise", a single on the 1997 album Dream Walkin' by Toby Keith